Jōvan Musk is a line of cologne for men and women. Barry Shipp developed the oil musk as a standalone fragrance and introduced it to the market in 1972 through Jōvan, Inc. Jōvan Musk's co-founder, Murray Moscona, created the oil fragrance's first iteration. The line is now being manufactured by Coty Inc.

In 1981, Jōvan signed a contract with the Rolling Stones for an image marketing tie-up.

Today there are also Jōvan Musk varieties of aftershave and deodorant, as well as a Musk Oil Gold for women. The fragrance is commonly sold at drug store and superstore chains. The company web site describes the cologne as "a blend of exotic spices and woods meets with the seductive power of musk."

References

External links

Perfumes
Products introduced in 1972